Jacob Gottfried Weber (March 1, 1779 – September 21, 1839) was a prominent German writer on music (especially on music theory), composer, and jurist.

Biography
Weber was born at Freinsheim. From 1824 to 1839, he was the editor of Cäcilia, a musical periodical published in Mainz, which influenced musical thought in Germany during the early Romantic era.

His most important work is his Versuch einer geordneten Theorie der Tonsetzkunst ("Theory of Musical Composition") (Mainz: B. Schott, 1817–21), which introduced several concepts that have since become important in the study of music theory. In this work, Weber develops the idea of "Mehrdeutigkeit" (that is, "multiple meaning"), a term initially introduced by Georg Joseph Vogler. Weber's "multiple meaning" refers to individual tones and harmonies, based on their context in a piece of music. For example, a C major triad may serve as I in C major, IV in G major, V in F major, etc. "To analyze a chord, a theorist must ask not only 'What notes are in it?' but also 'How is it behaving in the harmonic progression?'" (Thompson); see diatonic function. In the same work, Weber also further develops Vogler's idea of Roman numeral designations applied to chords. Unlike Vogler, Weber implements upper and lower case symbols to show not only the position of each chord related to the scale degree upon which it is built, but also the quality of each chord, i.e. major, minor, diminished, etc. Weber's Roman numeral system of analysis is in wide use in universities all over the world today to varying degrees, albeit with some modifications.

Weber's Theory of Musical Composition was the first work on music theory to be translated into English for publication in the United States (transl. by James F. Warner, Boston: Oliver Ditson, 1846).

He died in Bad Kreuznach.

See also
Difficile lectu (Mozart)#First performance—a tale Weber told about Mozart in the pages of Caecilia.

References
 Jairo Moreno: Musical Representations, Subjects, and Objects (Bloomington, IN: Indiana University Press, 2004), .
  
 David M. Thompson: A History of Harmonic Theory in the United States (Kent, OH: Kent State University Press, 1980), .
 Gottfried Weber: Versuch einer geordneten Theorie der Tonsetzkunst, Volume 1 (Mainz: B. Schott's Söhne, 1832).
 Volume 2 (Mainz: B. Schott's Söhne, 1832).
 Gottfried Weber: Theory of Musical Composition, trans. James F. Warner (Boston: Wilkins, Carter and Co., 1846).

External links
 

1779 births
1839 deaths
19th-century classical composers
19th-century German composers
19th-century German male musicians
German male classical composers
German Romantic composers
German music theorists